Melissa Ray (born 25 April 1984) is an association football player who represented New Zealand at international level.

Ray made her Football Ferns début as a substitute in 9-0 World Cup qualifier win over Cook Islands on 9 April 2003, and finished her international career with eight caps to her credit.

References

External links

1984 births
Living people
New Zealand women's international footballers
New Zealand women's association footballers

Women's association footballers not categorized by position